Anne Panter (born 28 January 1984) is an English field hockey international, who was a member of the England and Great Britain women's field hockey team since 2002, and was part of the bronze medal-winning team at the 2012 Summer Olympics.

Personal life
Panter studied Mathematics and Economics at the University of Nottingham.

References

External links
 
 
 
 
 

1984 births
People educated at Wellingborough School
English female field hockey players
Living people
Olympic field hockey players of Great Britain
British female field hockey players
Field hockey players at the 2008 Summer Olympics
Sportspeople from Kettering
Olympic medalists in field hockey
Olympic bronze medallists for Great Britain
Field hockey players at the 2012 Summer Olympics
Alumni of the University of Nottingham
Medalists at the 2012 Summer Olympics